The 24th Vanier Cup was played on November 19, 1988, at Varsity Stadium in Toronto, Ontario, and decided the CIAU football champion for the 1988 season. The Calgary Dinos won their third championship by defeating the Saint Mary's Huskies by a score of 52-23. This was the last Vanier Cup game to be played at Varsity Stadium as the championship would be played at the new SkyDome the following year.

References

External links
 Official website

Vanier Cup
Vanier Cup
1988 in Toronto
November 1988 sports events in Canada